The Fifth Act: America's End in Afghanistan is a 2022 memoir written by Elliot Ackerman.

Overview 
In this book, Ackerman recounts his life as an infantry officer on combat missions, his decision to leave the military, and the efforts to get Afghans out of the country in 2021 during the U.S. withdrawal. The Fifth Act was published by Penguin Press in August 2022.

References

American memoirs
2022 books
Penguin Books
Books about war
Books about Afghanistan
Books about the United States military